The Radio Astronomy Lab (RAL) is an Organized Research Unit (ORU) within the Astronomy Department at the University of California, Berkeley. It was founded by faculty member Harold Weaver in 1958. 
Until 2012, RAL maintained a radio astronomy observatory at Hat Creek, near Mt. Lassen.  It continues to support on-campus laboratory facilities in Campbell Hall. From 1998 to 2012, the RAL collaborated with the SETI Institute of Mountain View California to design, build and operate the Allen Telescope Array (ATA).

RAL has been central to the creation of several radio observatories, including:
 Hat Creek Radio Observatory (HCRO),
 the Allen Telescope Array (ATA),
 the Berkeley-Illinois-Maryland Association (BIMA) array,
 the Combined Array for Research in Millimeter-wave Astronomy (CARMA) array,
 the Precision Array for Probing the Epoch of Reionization (PAPER) array

Research Interests 
 Millimeter-wavelength interferometry
 Very Long Baseline Interferometry
 Low-frequency radio interferometry targeting the Epoch of Reionization
 Pulsars and other radio transients
 Digital signal processing (DSP) instrumentation

Directors  
 Carl Heiles (director, 2010-current)
 Donald Backer (director, 2008–2010), deceased
 Leo Blitz (director, 1996–2008)
 William "Jack" Welch (director, 1972–1996), retired
 Harold Weaver (director, 1958–1972), retired

Current Faculty  
 Carl Heiles
 Leo Blitz
 Imke de Pater
 Geoff Bower
 Aaron Parsons

Senior Scientific Staff 
 Dick Plambeck
 Melvyn Wright

See also 
 List of astronomical societies

References

External links 
 RAL homepage
 RAL 50th anniversary symposium

University of California, Berkeley
Astronomy organizations
1959 establishments in California
Science and technology in the San Francisco Bay Area